Atagün Yalçınkaya (born December 14, 1986) is a Turkish boxer in the bantamweight (54 kg) division best known for winning the silver medal in the light-flyweight category at the 2004 Olympics.

Amateur 
Yalçınkaya started boxing from a young age and won six titles in the schoolboy and cadet categories in Turkey.

He was successful as a teenager at international tournaments with a 2003 1st place win in the Balaton Tournament in Hungary, a 3rd place in Green Hill Cup, Pakistan and a 1st place in European Students Boxing championship, Italy.

Yalçınkaya qualified for the 2004 Summer Olympics by ending up in second place at the 4th AIBA European 2004 Olympic Qualifying Tournament in Baku, Azerbaijan. He competed at light-flyweight in Athens, Greece and won a silver medal for Turkey on August 29, 2004, by beating Alfonso Pinto and reigning worldchamp Sergey Kazakov. At age 17, he was the youngest medal-winning sportsman in Turkish Olympics history.
 Defeated Jolly Katongole (Uganda) 22-7
 Defeated Jeyhun Abiyev (Azerbaijan) 23-20
 Defeated Alfonso Pinto (Italy) 33-24
 Defeated Sergey Kazakov (Russia) 26-20
 Lost to Yan Bartelemí Varela (Cuba) 16-21

He went up to flyweight (51 kg) afterwards and won the Mediterranean Games in Almeria, Spain at the 2005 world championships (Mianyang, China) he defeated Andrzej Rzany (Poland) 20-13 but lost to Georgy Balakshin (Russia) 15-36.

At the European Championships 2006 he lost early to Englishman Stuart Langley.

Later he competed at bantamweight .

Yalçınkaya, 1.65 m tall, is a member of Fenerbahçe SK and is coached by Enver Yilmaz.

Pro 
In 2008 he signed a contract with German-based Ahmed Öner and turned pro in March 2008.

References

External links
 

1986 births
Living people
Sportspeople from Ankara
Fenerbahçe boxers
Olympic boxers of Turkey
Boxers at the 2004 Summer Olympics
Olympic silver medalists for Turkey
Olympic medalists in boxing
Bantamweight boxers
Light-flyweight boxers
Medalists at the 2004 Summer Olympics
Turkish male boxers
Mediterranean Games gold medalists for Turkey
Competitors at the 2005 Mediterranean Games
Mediterranean Games medalists in boxing
21st-century Turkish people